Francisco de Moura Rolim, also Francisco Rolim or  Francisco Roulim (1580 in Olinda – 1657 in Lisbon) was a Portuguese colonial administrator and a military officer in Brazil. He was born in Olinda, Brazil, in 1580. He was appointed as governor-general of Brazil in 1625 by Matias de Albuquerque. He was succeeded by Diogo Luiz de Oliveira in 1626. He died in Lisbon in 1657.

References

1580 births
1657 deaths
Governors-General of Brazil
Portuguese colonial governors and administrators